The men's long jump at the 2022 World Athletics Indoor Championships took place on 18 March 2022.

Results
The final was started at 19:05.

References

Long jump
Long jump at the World Athletics Indoor Championships